The 1983 Nevada Wolf Pack football team represented the University of Nevada, Reno during the 1983 NCAA Division I-AA football season. Nevada competed as a member of the Big Sky Conference (BSC). The Wolf Pack were led by eighth-year head coach Chris Ault and played their home games at Mackay Stadium.

Schedule

Notes

References

Nevada
Nevada Wolf Pack football seasons
Big Sky Conference football champion seasons
Nevada Wolf Pack football